Pumpic is a parental mobile monitoring service launched in 2012. The company develops and supports mobile and tablet monitoring software compatible with iOS and Android platforms. Pumpic application was initially created for parents or guardians to monitor and control activities on their kids' devices. It has many customer support resources and a variety of alerts and restrictions parents can set on their child's device. The monitoring and controlling features are available from a PC, smartphone or tablet after installing the application on the target device.

Features 
Pumpic application has more than 20 features. It allows parents to monitor text messages, call history, contacts, emails, and popular messaging apps including Kik, WhatsApp, and Snapchat. Here is the list of all features.

Reviews 
 App Advice
 Huffington Post
 Top Ten Reviews
 Android Guys
 iOS Hacker

References 

Content-control software
Internet safety